Purba Bishnupur is a census town within the jurisdiction of the Mandirbazar police station in the Mandirbazar CD block in the Diamond Harbour subdivision of the South 24 Parganas district in the Indian state of West Bengal.

Geography

Area overview
Diamond Harbour subdivision is a rural subdivision with patches of urbanization. Only 14.61% of the population lives in the urban areas and an overwhelming 85.39% live in the rural areas. In the eastern portion of the subdivision (shown in the map alongside) there are 24 census towns. The entire district is situated in the Ganges Delta and the eastern part of the district is a flat plain area with small towns, many in clusters. Location of places in the larger map varies a little. It is an OpenStreetMap, while we are using coordinates as in Google Maps.

Note: The map alongside presents some of the notable locations in the subdivision. All places marked in the map are linked in the larger full screen map.

Location
Purba Bishnupur  is located at

Demographics
According to the 2011 Census of India, Purba Bishnupur had a total population of 13,060 of which 6,660 (51%) were males and 6,400 (49%) were females. There were 1,791 persons in the age range of 0–6 years. The total number of literate persons in Purba Bishnupur was 8,751 (77.66% of the population over 6 years).

Infrastructure
Among the physical aspects, there is a railway station at Jaynagar Majilpur 4 km away. Among the civic amenities, it had 3 km roads with both open and covered drains, the protected water supply involved hand pumps, tanks, ponds, lakes. It had 1,986 domestic electric connections and 265 road light points. Among the educational facilities it had were 6 primary schools, 2 middle schools, 2 secondary schools, the nearest senior secondary school at Jaynagar Majilpur 4 km away, the nearest general degree college at Dakshin Barasat 15 km away. It had 1 recognised shorthand, typewriting, and vocational training institution, 1 non-formal education centre (Sarbya Siksha Abhijan). Among the social, recreational and cultural facilities, it had 1 public library and 1 reading room. It had the branch of 1 nationalised bank.

Transport
Purba Bishnupur is on the State Highway 1.

Mathurapur Road railway station is located nearby.

Education
Ramakanta Nagar Bidyamandir is a Bengali-medium coeducational institution, established in 1969. It has facilities for teaching from class VI to class XII.

Healthcare
Naiyarat Rural Hospital at Naiyarat, with 30 beds, is the major government medical facility in the Mandirbazar CD block.

References

Cities and towns in South 24 Parganas district